Lakshman Yapa Abeywardena (born June 7, 1955) is a Sri Lankan politician. He was State Minister for State Enterprise Development in the government of President Maithripala Sirisena. A representative of Matara District for the United People's Freedom Alliance in the Parliament of Sri Lanka, he formerly served as the cabinet minister of parliamentary affairs, Minister of Media, Deputy Minister of Economic Development, Minister of Foreign Employment Welfare, deputy minister of civil aviation and as the cabinet minister of Investment Promotion. He has been in parliament since 1994 and 2015 is the 21st year in the parliament.

Abeywardana was born in 1955 to a political family in Matara District, in Southern Province, where his father held local and provincial leadership positions. He was educated at St. Servatius College, Matara and Mahinda College, Galle.

Abeywardana has been a proponent of various micro-level development programs to enable the people to improve their quality of life. He is the Chairman of the Lakshman Yapa Abeywardana Foundation. Abeywardana resides in Colombo. He is married and has three sons. His son Pasanda Yapa Abeywardana is a member of the Southern Provincial council.

See also
List of political families in Sri Lanka

References

External links
 

1955 births
Living people
Sri Lankan Buddhists
Members of the 10th Parliament of Sri Lanka
Members of the 11th Parliament of Sri Lanka
Members of the 12th Parliament of Sri Lanka
Members of the 13th Parliament of Sri Lanka
Members of the 14th Parliament of Sri Lanka
Members of the 15th Parliament of Sri Lanka
Sri Lanka Podujana Peramuna politicians
Government ministers of Sri Lanka
United National Party politicians
United People's Freedom Alliance politicians
Alumni of Mahinda College
People from Matara, Sri Lanka